1P  may refer to:
1 naya paisa (Indian coin)
1 paisa (Indian coin)
1p, an arm of Chromosome 1 (human)
1P, proved Oil reserves
British Pound Sterling 1p coin, see Penny (British decimal coin)
Halley's Comet official name of 1P/Halley
Polonia 1, 1P, Polish TV channel of the Polcast Television
Single player video game

See also
P1 (disambiguation)